Queenie Watts (born Mary Spenton; 21 July 1923  – 25 January 1980) was an English actress of film and television, as well as an occasional singer. She was noted for her broad cockney accent.

Biography 
Watts was born Mary Spenton in London in 1923. She appeared in many British films, including the Joan Littlewood production Sparrers Can't Sing (1963), and as herself in Portrait of Queenie (1964), featuring in scenes set around Poplar, the Isle of Dogs and the Iron Bridge Tavern, Poplar, which she ran in real life and in which she starred in the TV series Stars and Garters (1963). In 1966 she appeared in the film version of Alfie, singing "Goodbye, Dolly Gray" in a memorable, riotous bar-room brawl sequence, and also appeared as a pub singer in the Tommy Steele film Half a Sixpence in 1967. A film directed by Michael Orrom called Portrait of Queenie was made in 1964, in which she sang jazz standards and some originals songs was released by the BFI. In the film she collaborated with a number of musicians including Stan Tracey and his band at the time. Her sole record called Queen High, in which she sang the same songs from Portrait of Queenie, was released in 1966 on the UK Columbia label with catalogue number SX 6047.

She also appeared in Ken Loach's Poor Cow (1967), in the film version of Up the Junction (1968), as a pub landlady in All Coppers Are... (1972), and as the ill-fated housekeeper in the horror film Schizo (1976).

She also appeared in many British 1970s sex comedies including Keep It Up, Jack (1973), Intimate Games (1976), Come Play with Me (1977) and Confessions from the David Galaxy Affair (1979). She was often seen in television programmes through the 1960s and 1970s, including the successful, but critically panned, Romany Jones (1972–75) and its sequel Yus, My Dear (1976) in which Arthur Mullard featured as her husband. Watts also appeared with Mullard, playing Lily and Wally Briggs from Romany Jones, in the third On the Buses film spin-off Holiday on the Buses in 1973. She was also a mainstay of the comedy drama series Beryl's Lot, appearing as Beryl's neighbor Freda Mills from 1973-75.

On stage, she played Mary in Edward Bond's play Saved at the Royal Court Theatre in 1969.

Watts appeared in Dad's Army in the role of Mrs Edna Peters, also in several episodes of Dixon of Dock Green in different roles, in two episodes of Callan (appearing as the aunt of petty crook Lonely, played by Russell Hunter), and one episode of Steptoe and Son (1972). She appeared in three episodes of the Play for Today anthology series for the BBC, including Waterloo Sunset transmitted on 23 January 1979.

She ran pubs (including the Iron Bridge Tavern, East India Dock Road, London and the Rose and Crown, Pennyfields, Poplar) with her husband, "Slim Watts", where she also sang and played piano with an eight-piece band to pull in more customers.

Death
Watts died in London from cancer in 1980, aged 56. She is buried with her husband in the East London Cemetery.

Filmography
Sparrows Can't Sing (1963) - Queenie
Alfie (1966) - Blonde Pub Singer (uncredited)
Poor Cow (1967) - Aunt Emm
Half a Sixpence (1967) - Pub Character
Up the Junction (1968) - Mrs. Hardy
The Best House in London (1969) - Old Crone (uncredited)
All Coppers Are... (1972) - Mrs. Malloy
Holiday on the Buses (1973) - Mrs. Briggs
Keep It Up, Jack (1973) - Char lady
 Intimate Games (1976) - John's mother
Schizo (1976) - Mrs. Wallace
Come Play with Me (1977) - Cafe Girl
Confessions from the David Galaxy Affair (1979) - David Galaxy's Mother

References

Further reading
Keeping the British End Up: Four Decades of Saucy Cinema by Simon Sheridan (Titan Books) (4th edition) (published 2011),

External links

1923 births
1980 deaths
Actresses from London
Deaths from cancer in England
English film actresses
English television actresses
Singers from London
20th-century English actresses
20th-century English singers
20th-century English women singers